Events from the year 1816 in Canada.

Incumbents
Monarch: George III

Federal government
Parliament of Lower Canada: 8th (until February 29)
Parliament of Upper Canada: 6th (until April 1)

Governors
Governor of the Canadas: Robert Milnes
Governor of New Brunswick: George Prévost
Governor of Nova Scotia: John Coape Sherbrooke
Commodore-Governor of Newfoundland: Richard Goodwin Keats
Governor of Prince Edward Island: Charles Douglass Smith

Events
 January 5 – Sir George Prevost dies before consideration of Commodore Yeo's charges; but the Duke of Wellington says: "He must have returned, after the fleet was beaten, I am inclined to think he was right. I have told ministers, repeatedly, that naval superiority, on the Lakes, is a sine qua non of success in war on the frontiers of Canada, even if our object should be wholly defensive."
 June 19 – After several years of harassment, sabotage, and minor skirmishes between members of the Hudson's Bay and North West Companies, a full-scale battle (today known at Battle of Seven Oaks) breaks out between parties led by Cuthbert Grant and Robert Semple.  The Hudson's Bay men, instigators of the confrontation though outnumbered nearly three to one, suffer 21 deaths, while Grant's party suffers two deaths, one Métis and one Native.  The battle is frequently cited as a seminal moment in the history of the Métis people.
 A steamboat PS Frontenac is first placed on Lake Ontario.

Births
 October 5 – George Kingston, meteorologist (d.1886) 
 December 30 – William Alexander Henry, politician (d.1888) 
 December 31 – Joseph-Édouard Cauchon, politician (d.1885)

Deaths
 January 5 – Sir George Prevost (b.1767)

References 

 
Canada
16
1816 in North America